Statistics of Swedish football Division 3 for the 1936–37 season.

League standings

Uppsvenska Östra 1936–37

Uppsvenska Västra 1936–37

Östsvenska 1936–37

Mellansvenska 1936–37

Nordvästra 1936–37

Södra Mellansvenska 1936–37

Sydöstra 1936–37

Västsvenska Norra 1936–37

Västsvenska Södra 1936–37

Sydsvenska 1936–37

Footnotes

References 

Swedish Football Division 3 seasons
3
Sweden